Rejoicing is an album by the guitarist Pat Metheny that was released in 1984 by ECM. It features the guitarist in a trio with Charlie Haden on bass and Billy Higgins on drums, both of whom played and recorded with Ornette Coleman in the late 1950s and early 1960s. In addition to his own compositions, Metheny plays three compositions by Coleman, and Horace Silver's "Lonely Woman" (not to be confused with the Coleman composition of the same title, which Metheny does not play on the album).

Reception
Scott Yanow of AllMusic gave the album 4.5 stars and said, "Throughout this excellent set, Metheny and his sidemen engage in close communication and create memorable and unpredictable music."

Track listing

Personnel
 Pat Metheny  – acoustic and electric guitars, guitar synthesizer
 Charlie Haden – double bass
 Billy Higgins – drums

References

Pat Metheny albums
1983 albums
Albums produced by Manfred Eicher
ECM Records albums